Gönc is a district in north-eastern part of Borsod-Abaúj-Zemplén County. Gönc is also the name of the town where the district seat is found. The district is located in the Northern Hungary Statistical Region.

Geography 
Gönc District borders with the Slovakian region of Košice to the north, Sátoraljaújhely District and Sárospatak District to the east, Tokaj District and Szerencs District to the south, Szikszó District and Encs District to the west. The number of the inhabited places in Gönc District is 32.

Municipalities 
The district has 2 towns and 30 villages.
(ordered by population, as of 1 January 2012)

The bolded municipalities are cities.

Demographics

In 2011, it had a population of 19,275 and the population density was 35/km².

Ethnicity
Besides the Hungarian majority, the main minorities are the Roma (approx. 2,500), Slovak (150) and Rusyn (100).

Total population (2011 census): 19,275
Ethnic groups (2011 census): Identified themselves: 20,542 persons:
Hungarians: 17,348 (84.45%)
Gypsies: 2,698 (13.13%)
Others and indefinable: 496 (2.41%)
Approx. 1,500 persons in Gönc District did declare more than one ethnic group at the 2011 census.

Religion
Religious adherence in the county according to 2011 census:

Catholic – 10,988 (Roman Catholic – 9,817; Greek Catholic – 1,171);
Reformed – 4,325;
Evangelical – 65;
other religions – 129; 
Non-religious – 598; 
Atheism – 35;
Undeclared – 3,135.

Gallery

See also
List of cities and towns of Hungary

References

External links
 Postal codes of the Gönc District

Districts in Borsod-Abaúj-Zemplén County